Sarn railway station is a railway station serving the village of Sarn, South Wales. It is located on the Maesteg Line from Cardiff via Bridgend.

The station was opened by British Rail on 28 September 1992.

Passenger services are operated by Transport for Wales as part of the Valley Lines network for local services.

References

External links

Railway stations in Bridgend County Borough
DfT Category F2 stations
Railway stations opened by British Rail
Railway stations in Great Britain opened in 1992
Railway stations served by Transport for Wales Rail